Hilary Matanga (born 9 July 1984) is a Zimbabwean first-class cricketer.

References

External links
 

1984 births
Living people
Zimbabwean cricketers
Masvingo cricketers
Southern Rocks cricketers
Sportspeople from Marondera